Liu Shenggang (born 15 November 1976) is a Chinese judoka. He competed in the men's heavyweight event at the 1996 Summer Olympics.

References

1976 births
Living people
Chinese male judoka
Olympic judoka of China
Judoka at the 1996 Summer Olympics
Place of birth missing (living people)
Judoka at the 2002 Asian Games
Asian Games medalists in judo
Asian Games bronze medalists for China
Medalists at the 2002 Asian Games
20th-century Chinese people